Carrizal is a district of the Alajuela canton, in the Alajuela province of Costa Rica.

Geography 
Carrizal has an area of  km2 and an elevation of  metres.

Demographics 

For the 2011 census, Carrizal had a population of  inhabitants.

Transportation

Road transportation 
The district is covered by the following road routes:
 National Route 125
 National Route 126

References 

Districts of Alajuela Province
Populated places in Alajuela Province